Jamshidabad (also Romanized as Jamshīdābād) is a village in Hoseynabad Rural District, in the Central District of Anar County, Kerman Province, Iran. At the 2006 census, its population was 180, in 50 families.

References 

Populated places in Anar County